Spikebuccinum stephaniae is a species of sea snail, a marine gastropod mollusk in the family Buccinidae.

Description

Distribution

References

  Harasewych M.G. & Kantor Y.I. (2004) The deep-sea Buccinoidea (Gastropoda: Neogastropoda) of the Scotia Sea and adjacent abyssal plains and trenches. The Nautilus 118(1): 1–42

Buccinulidae
Gastropods described in 2004